Thompson Beach is a locality in the Australian state of South Australia located on the eastern coastline of Gulf St Vincent about  north of the Adelaide city centre.  Thompson Beach started as a sub-division in 1980 with boundaries being created in June 1997.  Land use with the locality is principally residential with built development being of a ‘low density’.  Thompson Beach is located within the federal Division of Grey, the state electoral district of Narungga, and the local government area of the Adelaide Plains Council.

See also
Thompson (disambiguation)

References
Notes

Citations

Towns in South Australia
Gulf St Vincent